Greatest Hits Live is the second live album by Australian singer Tina Arena which was recorded during her 2004 Greatest hits Australian tour and released in late 2005. It was Arena's first live album to be released in her native Australia because Vous Êtes Toujours Là (2003) was only released in France. The album contains a CD and DVD featuring her concert recorded on 7 December 2004 at the Sydney State Theatre.

Track listing
"Soul Mate #9" (Peter Amato, Tina Arena, Desmond Child) – 4:47
"Take Me Apart" (Fiona Kernaghan) – 4:00
"If I Didn't Love You" (Arena, Pam Reswick, Steve Werfel) – 4:47
"That's the Way a Woman Feels" (Arena, Reswick, Werfel) – 5:53
"I Want to Know What Love Is" (Mick Jones) – 6:09
"Wasn't It Good" (Arena, Heather Field, Robert Parde) – 5:09
"Les trois cloches (The Three Bells)" (Jean Villard) – 4:50
"Burn" (Arena, Reswick, Werfel) – 5:08
"You Made Me Find Myself" (Arena, Child, Ty Lacy) – 3:50
"Italian Love Song" (Arena, Francesco De Benedettis, Davide Esposito, Paul Manners) – 3:55
"Symphony of Life" (Arena, Peter-John Vettese) – 4:51
"Sorrento moon" (Arena, David Tyson, Christopher Ward) – 4:57
"Heaven Help My Heart" (Arena, Dean McTaggart, Tyson) – 6:27
"Chains" (Arena, Reswick, Werfel) – 7:03
"Dare You to Be Happy" (Arena, Vettese) – 6:16

Note
The DVD track listing is identical to the CD except "Italian Love Song" is replaced with "Now I Can Dance" (Arena, Tyson).

Personnel
Tina Arena – vocals
Paul Gray – piano, keyboards, Musical Director
Kere Buchanan – drums, percussion
Nick Sinclair – bass
Chris Kamzelas – guitars
Chris E Thomas – guitar, backing vocals
Angie Bekker – backing vocals

Charts and certifications

Certification (DVD)

References

2005 greatest hits albums
Tina Arena albums
2005 live albums
Columbia Records live albums